Robert Wayne Aschenbrener (November 22, 1920 – July 2, 2009) was an American fighter pilot and flying ace of World War II.

Early life
He was raised on the Indian reservation at Lac du Flambeau, Wisconsin. He attended Loras College in Dubuque, Iowa for two years before enlisting in the Army Air Corps in September 1941.

World War II
Aschenbrener received flight training at Kelly, Ballinger, San Angelo, and Moore Fields in Texas, and graduated with the class of 42H. Lieutenant Aschenbrener was assigned to the 8th Fighter Squadron (Black Sheep Squadron), 49th Fighter Group, then based in New Guinea. Flying the Curtiss P-40 Warhawk, he scored his first two victories on November 15, 1943, followed by another on February 15, 1944. Promoted to captain, he became operations officer and flew 272 combat missions before returning to the United States in the summer of 1944 to instruct other pilots in fighter tactics.

Wishing to return to combat, "Asch" (as he was nicknamed) wrangled a trip back to his old unit, now in the Philippines flying the Lockheed P-38 Lightning. Serving again as operations officer, he became an ace on November 24, 1944, when he downed three Kawasaki Ki-61s ("Tony"s) and one Mitsubishi A6M Zero ("Zeke") in one day. On December 11 and 14, 1944, he was credited with his ninth and tenth victories.

On Christmas Day 1944, during a strafing run on enemy occupied Clark Field, Aschenbrener's P-38 was hit by 20mm ground fire, and he crashed into a rice paddy barely  from the end of the runway. Picked up by Hukbalahap guerrillas, he hid in the jungle for nearly a month evading enemy troops on the lookout for him. He was joined by the crew of a Navy torpedo plane, as well as downed F-6F Hellcat ace Alexander Vraciu. Making it back to safety after 27 days, he returned to his unit, where he was promoted to major and assumed command of the 7th Fighter Squadron, 49th Fighter Group.

At this time, he met his soon to be wife, Laura Ann Middleton. They were married on recaptured Clark Air Base on August 20, 1945 in the shadow of Mount Pinatubo (a volcano which eventually destroyed the base) just a few miles from where his plane went down.

Before leaving the Army Air Force, Major Aschenbrener flew 345 combat missions and over 850 combat hours flying the P-40, P-47, and P-38 fighter aircraft.

Post-war
Major Aschenbrener returned to the United States in September 1945 and left the service to pursue a degree in journalism at the University of Missouri. After retiring from the Los Angeles Valley News, he and Ann moved to Cameron Park in northern California.

Aschenbrener died July 2, 2009 at the age of 88 in Sacramento, California, leaving behind eight children and over 30 grandchildren and great grandchildren.

Honors and awards
Major Aschenbrener earned the title "double ace" and received a total of 21 medals and citations, including:

  USAAF Pilot Badge

His Distinguished Service Cross Citation reads:

References

Further reading
 Whelan, James R. (October 1991). Hunters in the Sky: Fighter Aces of WW II. . Regnery Pub.

1920 births
2009 deaths
American World War II flying aces
Aviators from Wisconsin
People from Price County, Wisconsin
University of Missouri alumni
Journalists from California
Recipients of the Air Medal
Recipients of the Distinguished Flying Cross (United States)
Recipients of the Distinguished Service Cross (United States)
Shot-down aviators
United States Army Air Forces officers
United States Army Air Forces pilots of World War II
Military personnel from Wisconsin
20th-century American journalists
American male journalists